Southport station may refer to:

England
Southport railway station, in Southport, Merseyside
Southport Ash Street railway station, a former station in Southport, Lancashire
Southport Central railway station, a former station in Southport, Lancashire
Southport Eastbank Street railway station, a former station in Southport, Merseyside
Southport London Street railway station, a former station in Southport, Merseyside
Southport Lord Street railway station, a former station in Southport, Lancashire

Australia
Southport railway station, Queensland, (redirect to South Coast railway line, Queensland)
Southport light rail station, a public transport interchange in Southport, Queensland
Southport South light rail station, in Southport, Queensland
Southport Transit Centre, in Southport, Queensland

United States
Southport station (CTA), an 'L' station in Chicago, Illinois
Southport station (Metro-North), a commuter rail station in Southport, Connecticut

Other stations in Southport, Merseyside 
Butts Lane Halt railway station
Churchtown railway station, now closed
Crossens railway station, now closed
Hesketh Park railway station, now closed
Hillside railway station
Kew Gardens railway station (Merseyside), now closed
Meols Cop railway station
St Luke's railway station, now closed

Other stations in Southport, Queensland 
Broadwater Parklands light rail station
Griffith University light rail station
Nerang Street light rail station
Queen Street light rail station

Radio stations
Dune FM, a former Independent Local Radio station serving Southport, England, and surrounding areas
Sandgrounder Radio, serving Southport and the North West Coast of England
WAZO, licensed to Southport, North Carolina, United States
WFOX (FM), licensed to Southport, Connecticut, United States
WOKN, licensed to Southport, New York, United States

Other
Southport power station, a former electricity generating station in Southport, Lancashire, England
Pacific Cable Station, a former telegraph station in Southport, Queensland, Australia